Birdwell, makers of Birdwell Beach Britches, is an American surf clothing company headquartered in Santa Ana, California. Founded by Carrie Birdwell Mann in 1961, the company manufactures and sells customized heavy-duty swimsuits, which are sold internationally. With four basic models, various fabrics, including Surfnyl, Tactel, heavy nylon, sailcloth, and canvas, more than 40 colors, and various other options, the combinations that can be created are nearly endless. The company's motto is "We don't build 1000 things. We build one thing 1000 ways."

The swimsuits themselves, which resemble board shorts, are paneled swimsuits, with waistbands resembling those of boxing trunks, always double-stitched, always with two layers of fabric. These shorts are known and favored among surfers, lifeguards, and paddleboarders, because of their quick-drying design and extreme durability; with an estimated 10 years for average use, and 2–5 for more strenuous use.

On all of the trunks there is a  logo, of a stylized anthropomorphic surfboard, wearing, of course, Birdwell Beach Britches, nicknamed "Birdie".

References

External links 
 

Clothing companies of the United States
Companies based in Santa Ana, California
Surfwear brands